Aakkulam is a region in Trivandrum city, the capital of Kerala state in India. It is about 10 km from Thiruvananthapuram city center. situated where the Akkulam Lake joins the sea.

Akkulam Tourist village and Akkulam Boat Club are the major picnic spots in the area. The LuLu Mall Trivandrum mall is located here. A small park was recently built near the lake for recreational activities.

The Southern Air Command of the Indian Air Force is located at Aakkulam.

See also

 Tourism in Thiruvananthapuram
 Tourism in Kerala
 Ulloor

References

Tourist attractions in Thiruvananthapuram
Suburbs of Thiruvananthapuram
Villages in Thiruvananthapuram district